Gerasim Georgijević (1791–d. January 1804) or Đurđević (Ђурђевић), known as Hadži Gerasim (Хаџи Герасим) and Hadži-Đera (Хаџи-Ђера), was a Serbian Orthodox jeromonah (priest-monk) and the hegumen (monastery head) of the Monastery of Moravci near Ljig. He was killed during the "Slaughter of the Knezes" in 23–29 January 1804, along with other notable Serbs, after participating in a plot against the Dahije.

References
 
  
  
 
 

18th-century births
1804 deaths
18th-century Eastern Orthodox clergy
19th-century Eastern Orthodox clergy
18th-century Serbian people
19th-century Serbian people
Serbian Orthodox clergy
Serbian monks
Serbian murder victims
Serbs from the Ottoman Empire
Murder victims from the Ottoman Empire
Serbian abbots
Trophy heads